Brian Tawse (born 30 July 1945) is a Scottish former professional footballer who made over 100 appearances in the Football League for Brighton & Hove Albion as a winger.

Career
Born in Ellon, Tawse played in the Football League for Arsenal, Brighton & Hove Albion and Brentford and made a total of 129 appearances between 1964 and 1971. He later played in South Africa for Durban City.

Personal life 
Tawse lived in South Africa for 17 years and as of January 2018, he was living in Westdene.

Career statistics

References

1945 births
Living people
Scottish footballers
Arsenal F.C. players
Brentford F.C. players
Brighton & Hove Albion F.C. players
Folkestone F.C. players
Southern Football League players
English Football League players
Association football wingers

Scottish expatriates in South Africa
Scottish expatriate footballers
Durban City F.C. players
National Football League (South Africa) players